Amyntor Flaminio Claudio Galli (Amintore Galli) (1845–1919) was an Italian composer, musicologist, and journalist.

Life 
He was born in Perticara, Italy on 12 October 1845, but began his musical studies with his uncle Pio Galli in Rimini until 1862 when he enrolled in the Milan Conservatory to be a pupil of Alberto Mazzucato. He would there compose the aria Cesare al Rubicone to be performed in the Teatro Vittorio Emanuel II in Rimini in 1864 and 1865  and after serving in the Italian Army under Giuseppe Garibaldi in the Battle of Bezzecca, graduated with the canata Espiazione.

He then moved to Amelia, Umbria where he became bandmaster in the city chapel and director of the town band between 1871 and 1873, as well as director of the Finale Emilia school from 1871 to 1873. In 1869, he began his career as a journalist as well, being art director of Stabilimento Musicale Sonzogno and editor of Edoardo Sonzogno's Euterpe though Sonzongno never credited him. In 1873 he moved to Milan once again to be Chairman of Counterpoint and Musical Aesthetics at the Conservatory of which he studied in, as well as music critic of the newspapers Il Secolo and editors of Il Teatro Illustrata and La Musica Popolare, all of which owned by Sonzogno. In this, he mainly translated French opera librettos and publishing singing and piano sheet music of multiple opera scores.

After gaining substantial fame from his composing and journalism, in 1894 he purchased a holiday home in Rimini but in 1906 or 1907 quit journalism, and in 1914 retired completely and moved to Rimini, where he died on December 8, 1919. The Teatro Vittorio Emanuel II, was renamed Teatro Amintore Galli in his name but was bombed in World War Two. The La Sagra Musicale Malatestiana music festival annually honours the theatre, as Rimini had not had a full theatre since. His original manuscripts are preserved in Rimini's Biblioteca Civica Gambalunga.

Selected works 

 1864, Milan, Cesare al Rubicone
 1866, Milan, Espiazione
 1870, Milan, La musica ed i musicisti dal secolo X sino ai nostri giorni
 1876, Turin, Il corno d'oro o Un'avventura nel serraglio
 1879, Milan, Alberto Mazzucato. Cenni commemorativi
 1879, Milan, Elementi di armonia
 1879, Milan, La musica dei greci, degli arabi e degli indiani
 1881, Milan, Storia ed estetica della musica
 1886, Milan, Saggio storico-teoretico sulla notazione musicale
 1887, Milan, Otello di Giuseppe Verdi. Cenni analitici
 1889, Milan, Il canto di sala e di teatro
 1889, Milan, Manuale del capo-musica. Trattato di strumentazione per banda
 1889, Milan, Il polifonista al pianoforte
 1891, Milan, Elementi di solfeggio, in chiave di sol per una e per due voci
 1891, Milan, Piccolo lessico del musicista
 1897, Milan, Strumenti e strumentazione
 1898, Milan, Etnografia musicale
 1899, Turin, Estetica della musica
 1904, Turin, e David
 Milan, Del canto liturgico cristiano
 Milan, Corso di musica sacra. L'omofonia della chiesa latina e la sua armonizzazione

References 

1845 births
1919 deaths
Italian composers
Italian musicologists